Youth organizations in the United States are of many different types. The largest is the government run 4-H program, followed by the federally chartered but private Scouting movement groups: the Boy Scouts of America (BSA) and the Girl Scouts of the USA (GSUSA).  Another somewhat smaller but co-ed Scouting derived group is Camp Fire. Other youth groups are religious youth ministries such as the evangelical Christian Awana, Seventh-day Adventist Pathfinders, and Assemblies of God Royal Rangers.

Smaller Scout-like groups include the Christian Trail Life USA for boys, American Heritage Girls for girls, the non-denominational co-ed Navigators USA and Baden-Powell Service Association, and pagan but non-discriminatory SpiralScouts International.

There are also two types of Masonic Youth groups called International Order of the Rainbow for Girls (IORG or just referred to as Rainbow), and Job's Daughters International (JDI). Both of these organizations have a background in the Christian Bible but you do not necessarily need to believe in God, just a supreme being. There are many different charities and service projects that are done throughout the year for those in need. 
Rainbow https://www.gorainbow.org/index.php
Job's Daughters https://jobsdaughtersinternational.org/

Catholic organizations

Columbian Squires

Columbian Squires is a Catholic boys' Scout-like organization run by the Knights of Columbus. The Squires considers itself to be an athletic team, social club, youth and civic improvement group, management training, civil rights group and spiritual development program.

Squires history
The Columbian Squires were begun in 1925. In December 2012, the Knights of Columbus was sued over supposed sexual abuse that had occurred in Brownsville, Texas by adult Columbian Squires leaders in the 1970s and 1980s. The Bishop of the Diocese of Bismarck in August 2015 recommended the Squires as a replacement, along with two other organizations, for the BSA, as he directed parishes to disassociate from the BSA due to their recent approval of gay adult leaders.

The Knights of Columbus in January 2016 moved to have the parish youth program dictate whether a Boy Scout troop or a Squire Circle fits and have the parish sponsor the troop. No new circle were to be formed and inactive circle be dissolved.

Squires program
Local groups are called Circles. The program's five advancement levels are:
 Page
 Shield Bearer
 Swordsman
 Lancer
 Squire of the Body of Christ

Federation of North-American Explorers

The Federation of North-American Explorers (FNE) is a Catholic Scouting association in Canada and the United States of America.  The association is a member of the International Union of Guides and Scouts of Europe.

FNE history
Federation of North-American Explorers was founded in 1999 by current commissioner Paul Ritchi, who was a Scouts Canada volunteer but felt a lack of "the spiritual component to make it personally fulfilling." While doing research, he found information on the Federation of Scouts of Europe, an international organization of national Catholic Scouting associations. The first FNE group, the "Timber Wolves", was then started with Richi, another leader, and 10 boys, ages 8 to 12.

The Bishop of the Diocese of Bismarck in August 2015 recommended FNE as a replacement, along with two other organizations, for the BSA, as he directed parishes to disassociate from the BSA due to their recent move to allow gay adult leaders.

FNE program
In addition to the usual camping trips, explorers go on pilgrimages, receive the sacraments and get hands-on religious education.

The age level groups are:
Otters, six- and seven-year-olds
Timber Wolves, eight to 12
Explorers, ages 12 to 15
Wayfarers, Explorer "graduates" and senior leaders of other Explorer sections

Kepha

Kepha is a Catholic boys' Scouting alternative organization in which the father also participates. The organization's name means "rock" in Greek.

Kepha program

The Kepha program had monthly retreats and shared daily prayers for brotherhood. Member have 2 AM two-hour Eucharistic adoration called "Yawns For Jesus".  They go camping but required cold showers for discipline.  The service work they do includes visiting nursing homes and hospitals.

Troops of Saint George

The Troops of Saint George, briefly the Scouts of Saint George, is a Catholic boys' Scouting organization focusing on father-son camping and catechetics through outdoor experiences. The organization's "hard launch" took place on January 1, 2014.

TSG history

The formation of the Scouts of St. George was announced by Taylor Marshall in May 2013 in response to the BSA's changing its membership policies for same-sex attracted youth. The program was planned to be free, open-source, grassroots and a traditional Boy Scout program with no 501(c)3 non-profit status (so as to keep government interference to a minimum). By October, the Scouts of St. George was forced, due to the BSA's ownership of the "Scouts" trademark, to change its name to "Troops of St. George". The organization filed for 501(c)3 status around the same time.

TSG program

The program is under development with an expected parallel program to the BSA.

Their "Trinitarian Salute" is "three fingers of the right hand (index, middle, ring) out, and with the pinky and thumb joined signifying that the divine nature of Christ is joined to His human nature: fully God and fully man as taught at the Catholic Council of Chalcedon".

Protestant groups

Awana

Awana is a coed, nondenominational, Christian, Scout-like organization. AWANA is an acronym for "Approved Workmen Are Not Ashamed" from 2 Timothy 2:15.

Awana history

Awana was founded in 1950 in Illinois. Originally, the organization would not affiliate a club with a church that belonged to the National Council of Churches, World Council of Churches, Pentecostal church or charismatic church. In 1995, AWANA lifted the restrictions.

Awana program

The program's age groups are:
 Puggles
 Cubbies (3–4 years old)
 Sparks (K-2nd grade)
 Truth & Training (3rd-5th grade)
 Trek (6th-8th grade)
 Journey 24-7 (9th-12th grade)

The AWANA holds various types of model racing events:
 AWANA Grand Prix is a wood car race, similar to a pinewood derby.
 AWANA Regatta or Sail On Night are boat races.
 Airplane Toss is held at Flying Higher Night, in which model airplanes are built with the participant's choice of material. Instead of a speed race there are awards for distance, aerobatics, and design.

Caravan

Caravan is a Christian Scout-like organization run by the Church of the Nazarene. With a first through sixth grade co-ed membership, the organization has 600 US clubs, which focus on church doctrine. There are also about 150 Boy Scouts of America troops affiliated with Nazarene churches.

Caravan history
One of Caravan's forerunners was started in the 1930s by LeRoy Haynes as Boy's Works. As it spread from church to church. the program was picked up in 1934 by Nazarene's Southern California district as its boys' program under Haynes direction. The next year, Girl's Works was started up under Jeanne Haynes. The Works programs spread past outside the district and were even promoted through a display at the 1936 General Assembly.

Rev. W. W. Clay, also in the 1930s, developed two Christian principles programs for kids: Bluebirds for young children and Pioneers for older children. With Rev. Milton Bunker, an Eagle Scout, Clay promoted these club programs and continued to develop them.

With inadequate materials and competing programs, the 1940 General Assembly formed a Commission on Boys' and Girls' Work that met from November 17–18 in Santa Cruz, California. The commission was composed of six western districts' representatives, three members of the commission on Boys' and Girls' Work, and two members of the Department of Church Schools. This Commission decided to replace the existing club programs with its own program. The Board of General Superintendents approved this commission's program, while a committee developed and wrote the books.

Caravan was started in 1946 with the release of the first Caravan book, Trailmarker, for boys ages 12 and up. Books that followed were Pathmarker (girls ages 12+), Signals (boys ages 9 to 11), and Signs (girls ages 9 to 11). That fall, the first official Nazarene Caravan club in the United States was started by Millington Church of the Nazarene in Michigan, under Rev. Bunker. In 1948, Bunker was appointed the first general director of Caravan. Carol Wordsworth of Youngstown, Ohio in October 1949 at a district Caravan Round-up was the first person to be granted the Phineas F. Brezee award. In 2005, the program was revised with the addition of the Core Values badges and modified or added skill badges.

Caravan program
Caravan's grade level groups are:
 Searchers (1-2)
 Explorers (3-4)
 Adventurers (5-6)
Adults leaders of a group are called guides. Earning badges is an optional part of this program.

The Milton Bunker Award is granted to Searchers who complete the necessary two-year requirements. The Phineas F. Brezee award, named after the Church of the Nazarene's founding pastor, is the highest award in Caravan. A member earns the award upon completion of eight core values studies, 16 Articles of Faith, 32 skill badges, four ministry projects and four missionary books. Additional awards, the Esther Carson Winans and Haldor Lillenas awards, are achievable using the requirements from the Brezee award.

Christian Service Brigade

Christian Service Brigade is an Evangelical Christian boys' Scout-like organization run by the CSB Ministries. The organization has chartered 300 units with members in the first through 12th grades, and works to build boys' character with an emphasis on the Bible. CSB is a partner of the GEMS Girls Clubs.

CSB history
Christian Service Brigade was established in 1937 by Joe Coughlin in Glen Ellyn, Illinois with a Methodist Sunday School sixth-grade boys' class in conjunction with Wheaton College's Christian Service Council. In 1939, an affiliated girls group was founded, Girls' Guild. Both groups received backing from Herbert J. Taylor's Christian Workers' Foundation starting in 1943. The Guild became Pioneer Girls in 1940 and remained a division of CSB until 1944.

CSB program
The Brigade is split into four age levels:
 Tadpoles (ages 4–5)
 Tree Climbers (ages 6–7)
 Stockade (ages 8–11)
 Battalion (ages 12–18)

The organization uses uniforms similar to the BSA. CSB runs a few shape and race events: the Shape N Race Derby wood car race for the Stockade level, and the Shape N Sail Derby boat race and Shape N Sled Derby, model sleds raced in a rain gutter packed with snow with a depression as a trail. The equivalent rank to the Boy Scouts' Eagle Scout is the rank of "Herald of Christ".

The CSB runs 11 camps:
 Stony Glen Camp, Madison, Ohio
 Wilderness Ridge Brigade Camp, Bastrop, Texas
 Camp Teepee Pole, Sundra, Alberta, Canada
 Sequoia Brigade Camp, Concord, Cuualifornia
 New England Frontier Camp, Lovell, Maine
 Camp Kaskitowa, Michigan
 Camp Nathanael, Minnesota
 Northern Frontier Camp, New York
 Hickory Hill Brigade Camp, New York
 Haycock Camping Ministries, Pennsylvania
 Hemlock Wilderness Brigade Camp, Wardensville, West Virginia

Dynamic Youth Ministries
Dynamic Youth Ministries is an organization that runs three youth groups: Calvinist Cadet Corps, GEMS Girls' Clubs and ThereforeGo Ministries.

Calvinist Cadet Corps

Calvinist Cadet Corps is an independent non-denominational Christian boys' Scouting organization usually affiliated with the Christian Reformed Church. Currently, the Corps has about 440 US clubs with weekly meetings including a Bible lesson.  Members range from first grade to high school. Merit badges are tied into Scripture.

CCC history
The Calvinist Cadet Corps was officially founded in 1952 in Reformed churches, as the Dutch of the Reformed Christian Churches supported Dutch parallel programs, compared to the Dutch of the Reformed Churches who generally joined the general organization. The Calvinettes and Young Calvinist Federation duplicated the GSUSA and Christian Endeavour respectively.

CCC program
The Corps is split into five ministries, or levels:
 Kingdom Kids (ages 4–5, and the only coed level)
 Junior Cadets (grades 1–3)
 Recruit-Pathfinder-Builder (grades 4–6)
 Guide Trails (grades 7–9)
 Voyageurs (grades 9-11)

The organization uses uniforms similar to the BSA.

Calvinist Cadet Corps holds Model Car Derbies.

GEMS Girls' Clubs

GEMS Girls' Clubs, formerly Calvinettes, is an independent non-denominational Christian girls' Scout-like organization. GEMS is an acronym for "Girls Everywhere Meeting The Savior".

GEMS history
The Calvinettes were founded in 1958. The Calvinist Cadet Corps and Young Calvinist Federation duplicated the Boy Scouts and Christian Endeavour respectively.

Frontier Girls

Frontier Girls is an independent Scouting style program for girls, open to girls and volunteers of all faiths.

Frontier Girls history

Frontier Girls was founded in 2007 by Kerry Cordy as she felt that GSUSA had moved away from skills and badges. After complaints that FG was for heterosexual girls only, Cordy developed the Quest Clubs program for sexuality-inclusive groups to start their own Scout-like program.

Frontier Girls program

Belief in God (any higher power) and living by the Frontier promise are membership requirements. Frontier Girls wear red, white and blue uniforms. The red vest is available through the program, but the white shirts and blue slacks and skirts are not.

Girls can work on over a thousand badges in nine Areas of Discovery: Art, Home, Technology, Character, the World, Health & Fitness, Outdoors, Agriculture and Knowledge. Frontier Girls has a set of Character badges with the requirement of earning one such badge a year. There are four badges (Emergency Preparedness, Etiquette, and either the Patriotism or Our Flag Badge) that all troops must earn once every three years; thus a girl would earn these badges at each level.

The girls can earn the same award, some with variant names, at the different age levels:
 Servant's Heart Award, community service hours
 Life Skills Achievement Award, show proficiency at several life skills
 Make a Difference Award, community service project leadership
 Reaching for the Stars Award, available at the Butterfly and Eagle levels, majoring in an Area of Discovery
 Gem Awards, the highest award at each level

A troop may consist of all age levels as the meeting time is split between age level activities and joint activities.
Quest Club is a coed affiliate of Frontier Girls.

Pathfinders 

Pathfinders is a Christian Scout-like organization run by the Seventh-day Adventist Church for boys (40%) and girls (60%) in grades 5-10. Currently, there are 2,000 clubs in North America, with membership open to non-Seventh-day Adventists. Considered a church ministry, the clubs focus on camping and community services with earnable honors and patches.

Pathfinders History
 Missionary Volunteer Society

In 1907, the forerunner Missionary Volunteer Society was founded. Seventh-day Adventist boys could not join the Boy Scouts when they started in 1910, due to events happening on the Sabbath, among other reasons. Local Seventh-day Adventist church leaders began, in 1911, various similar groups under names like Pals, Woodland Clans and Takoma Clan.

In 1919, the Mission Scouts of Madison, Tennessee were started by Arthur W. Spalding, who wrote a pledge and law for the group. The Missionary Volunteer Department of the General Conference began a class style award earning program in the 1920s. The Department's associate secretary received permission from the BSA to incorporate into a MV honors program parts from Merit Badges in 1928. In 1926, the denomination held its first summer camp in Michigan. In Santa Ana, California around 1929 to 1930, local Adventist clubs using the name Pathfinder were started by John McKim and Dr. Theron Johnston. A JMV summer camp was found in 1930 by the Southeastern California Conference was called Pathfinder Camp mostly likely due to the existence of the Santa Ana Pathfinder. The Santa Ana Pathfinders ended in 1936. A year later in Glendale, California, a new Pathfinder group was founded which also added military drills from the Adventist affiliated Medical Cadet Corps. There was a general opposition to these clubs by the denomination's leaders as they did not want the focus to be on missionary work as opposed to more secular pursuits. Despite this, Pathfinder Clubs were sprouting up all over California and the Pacific Northwest in the 1940s. The Southeastern California Conference youth director John Hancock started the first conference sponsored Pathfinder Club in Riverside in 1946.
 Pathfinder
With the action of the Southeastern California Conference, discussion regarding these clubs moved to the denomination's General Conference (GC), which in the 1950s recognized the program. The GC then adopted a program and guidelines while adopting a pledge and law similar to the Mission Scouts' version. The next year, the Oregon Conference held the first Pathfinder Fair and the GC issued the Pathfinder Staff Training Course publication.

Pathfinders program

The organization uses uniforms similar to Scouting. The members follow a Law and Pledge, go on campouts, and earn honor patches.

Pioneer Clubs 

Pioneer Clubs, formerly Girls' Guild and Pioneer Girls, is a Christian Scout-like organization run by the Pioneer Ministries. The Ministries consist of four divisions: Pioneer Girls, Pioneer Boys, Pioneer Clubs, and Clubes Pioneros.

PC history 
Girls' Guild was founded in 1939 as an affiliated girls' group of the Christian Service Brigade by Joe Coughlin and Betty Whitaker, 1st program director, on the request of Harriet Brehm, a sister of a Brigade member. In 1940, the Guild held its first summer camp at Fish Lake, Volo, Illinois. A new director took over in 1940, Viola Waterhouse, and another in 1941, Carol Erickson.

The Girls' Guild in 1941 was revamped and renamed by Erickson to the Pioneer Girls (PG). In 1943, Erickson approached Herbert J. Taylor who through his Christian Workers' Foundation funded the PG, gave advice, free administrative support and gave them office space in Chicago's Civic Opera Building. Taylor also had the organization form its first board of directors and had them incorporate by the end of 1943. The PG also started buying camps, all called Camp Cherith. From 1939 to 1950, the main source of church club sponsors were Baptist, although there was a range of different denomination also sponsoring.  In 1953, PG's headquarters was moved. In 1959, a mystery book series featuring two Pioneer Girls, called the Pioneer Girls Adventure Series, releasing at least three books.

With the camping program and camp expansion in 1971, the camps were placed in a separate corporation, and then a licensing agreement tied them back to Pioneer Girls.

In 1979, boys were allowed membership and had their own Pioneer Boys clubs in 1981. The Pioneer Girls in 1981 was renamed Pioneer Ministries, but known as Pioneer Clubs. In 1945, clubs were started in Canada. By 1976, the organization owned 19 camps in the US and 6 in Canada. Also, while dropping the pioneer theme, sister organizations were set up in 16 other countries including France, Italy, Korea, and Pakistan, with more in Latin America, the Caribbean and Africa. In Thailand, where its branch was founded by Pioneer alumni and missionary Joan Killilea, the branch was called the Friendship Club.

Pioneer Clubs programs 
Clubs can be operated under three formats based on the number and ages of the kids: Pioneer (for churches with 3-12 children per age group), Discovery (for a total of 3-12 kids from K-6) and Exploring (many kids, grades 1–6).
Pioneer program is split into five age levels:
 Skipper – ages 2 & 3
 Scooter – ages 4 & 5
 Voyager – grades 1 – 2
 Pathfinder – grades 3 – 4
 Trailblazer – grades 5 – 7

Pioneer Clubs hold wood car races called Pine Car Derby.

External links 
 Pioneer Girls at Vintagekidstuff.com

Royal Rangers 

Royal Rangers is a Christian boys' Scout-like organization run by the Assemblies of God. The Rangers have 4,000 US groups with members in kindergarten through 12th grade, with a goal to provide "Christlike character formation".  About 90 Boy Scout troops are sponsored by Assemblies of God churches. Many Pentecostal churches also use the Royal Rangers program. Some units in German use the name "Christian Royal Ranger Scouting".

History

Royal Rangers was established by the Assemblies of God in 1962. In 2012, Camporama had a high-ropes course, two zip lines, a water slide, and a lumberjack show.

Program

The organization uses uniforms similar to Scouting and parallel terms:
 outpost (troop)
 Ranger Code (Scout Law)
 Ranger Pledge (Scout Promise)
 Commander (Scoutmaster)
 merits (merit badges)
 Gold Medal of Achievement (Eagle Scout)

Their four program levels are divided by school grade:
 Ranger Kids (K-2nd grade)
 Discovery Rangers (3-5)
 Adventure Rangers (6-8)
 Expedition Rangers (9-12)
A Camporama is scheduled in the summer every four years at the organization's Eagle Rock, Missouri campground. The Rangers hold small car races called Pinewood Derby.

Salvation Army

Adventure Corps 

Adventure Corps, or The Salvation Army Boys' Adventure Corps, is a Christian Scout-like organization run by the Salvation Army. Currently, the organization has about 1,300 units of grades 1-8 boys. The boys do not have to be members of a Salvation Army congregation. In addition to the Adventure Corps, the Salvation Army has sponsored 130 Boy Scout troops. From 1913, the Salvation Army ran the Life Saving Scouts/Life Saving Guards-Boys teen age program to 1929 when it merged with the BSA.

History

The Adventure Corps was established in January 1983.

Program

The program core is based on Christian fellowship, teamwork and leadership. The Corps is split into two levels:  Explorers (grades 1 to 4), and Rangers (5 to 8).

Other groups 
  @ The Salvation Army Eastern Territory Youth Department - girls and boys in pre-k and kindergarten
  @ The Salvation Army Eastern Territory Youth Department
 Girl Guards  - grades 6 - 12

Southern Baptist Convention 
At the Southern Baptist Convention's meeting on June 11–12, 2013, the convention recommended that Southern Baptist Churches disaffiliate from the BSA and join alternative organizations, particularly those run by the Southern Baptist Convention.

Challengers 

The Challengers is a Christian teenage boys' Scout-like organization run by the Woman's Missionary Union of the Southern Baptist Convention.

The Challengers program is to equip boys in "mission education."

Royal Ambassadors 

Royal Ambassadors (RA) is a Christian boys' Scout-like organization run by the Woman's Missionary Union of the Southern Baptist Convention.  About 3,000 SBC churches sponsor groups. There are some Southern Baptist churches sponsoring Boy Scout troops. The name of the program was selected from the New Testament, where Christians are told by the Apostle Paul to be "ambassadors for Christ."

RA history

The Royal Ambassadors was founded in 1908 for elementary school aged boys after the WMU Annual Meeting in Hot Springs, Arkansas.

As the RA continued to grow, a convention-wide full-time RA secretary was needed in 1943.  The Brotherhood Commission took over the program in 1954. In 1997 that Memphis-based SBC agency was discontinued through a merger forming the North American Mission Board. With a shift in strategy, the board turned over regular operation of the RA in 2011.

The programs' age groups are Lads (grades 1–3), and Crusaders (4-6). The RA wooden mini-car race is called RA Racers. There is no uniform but they generally wear a T-shirt and own a vest to display their earned badges. Members can earn six "campcraft" patches: Discover 1/2/3, Hiker, Camper, Woodsman. The program is for missionary training and development. Thus, merit patches are earned for mission work and Bible verse memorization.

Navigators USA

Navigators USA is a secular co-ed Scout-like organization. In 2013, there were 45 chapters. The program had no uniform as of July 2013. A congress was held in the fall of 2013 where the issue of uniform was on the agenda.

The organization stresses outdoor activities and community service projects.

Navigators U.S.A. History

The Unitarian Church of All Souls sponsored a Boy Scout troop in New York City's East Harlem neighborhood. After disagreements over the Boy Scouts' exclusionary membership policies in 2003, the troop broke away to become a coed inclusive organization. All Souls has been underwriting the organization's operation for $10,000 to $20,000 a year since 2003. In fall 2010, Navigators issued its first handbook for the senior section, thus opening up the organization to the public. By March 2011, the group had seven chapters with four in New York City, three of which are through a partnership with a local service group, and one each in Binghamton, New York; Durham, North Carolina; and Belmont, Massachusetts. In 2012, the first and lone Illinois chapter was formed in Palatine via Countryside Church Unitarian Universalist. By June 2013, 29 new chapters had been formed in the previous year.

NU program

The organization has two program sections: Junior Navigators, age 7–10, and Senior Navigators age 11–18. Juniors have three levels:
 Mira
 Vega
 Polaris

The Senior section has four levels:
 Mira
 Shadow
 Tracker
 Pilot
 Navigator

The program's top award is the Summit Achievement Award.

SpiralScouts International

SpiralScouts International (SSI) is an independent, secular, inclusive, coed, Scout-like organization built on pagan beliefs and practices. SSI has 45 units called circles and hearths, or families.

SSI history

The Aquarian Tabernacle Church, a Wiccan community in Index, Washington, sponsored a pagan Scout group in 1999. The church looked for a non-belief based program but found none. It was renamed SpiralScouts International in 2001 to expand nationwide, at which time they dropped their Wiccan identification. The BSA sent a cease and decide letter to SpiralScouts, to which they responded with no future contact with the BSA. Since the Boy Scouts' membership policies are disapproved of by SSI, SSI offered their highest award to any Eagle Scout returning their Eagle Badge in protest.

Program

The group can be a Hearth that consists of one family or as a "circle" with community membership. Members are placed into local groups called Circles, which may consist of age group Hearths. The age level groups of the Hearths are FireFlies (ages 3–8), SpiralScouts (8–14), and PathFinders (14–18). 
The program's pagan twist is that its badges have a culture's myth relationship component and its dress uniform of a capuche and a braided, beaded macramé necklace. The activity uniform consists of a forest green polo shirt with khaki bottoms (pants, short, skirt or skort) and the SpiralScouts neck cord.

Earth Scouting
Earth Scouting or Scout-like groups, also called Green Scouting, are those that are eco-oriented groups.

Earth Champs

Earth Champs is an independent non-denominational Scout-like organization, a program of the Sustainable Business Coalition of Tampa Bay, Inc.

Earth Scouts was founded in 2002. The BSA owning the trademark to "Scouts" forced Earth Scouts to change their name a decade later to Earth Champs. By July 2013, four chapters were operational with four more at the start-up level.

The Earth Champs program aims to get children interested and involved in activities that support the environment and living sustainably.

Kids for Earth

Kids for Earth is an independent non-denominational secular eco-focused Scout-like organization.

Kids for Earth was founded in 2009 by Aditi Sen after watching An Inconvenient Truth.

Youth wings of political parties
 Armenian Youth Federation – founded in 1933, youth wing of the socialist Armenian Revolutionary Federation
 National Socialist Liberation Front – a neo-Nazi youth group that existed from 1969 until sometime in the 1980s
 Revolutionary Communist Youth Brigade – succeeded by the Revolutionary Student Brigade; both existed during the 1980s
 Socialist Youth League (United States) – existed from 1946 to 1954 and eventually merged with the Young People's Socialist League (1907)
 Teen Age Republicans
 W.E.B. Du Bois Clubs of America
 Young Communist League USA
 Young Democratic Socialists
 Young Democrats of America
 Young People's Socialist League 
 Young People's Socialist League (1907)
 Young Pioneers of America
 Young Republicans
 Young Socialist Alliance

Religious
 Epworth League – Methodist youth group founded in 1889 
 First Priority – middle and high school evangelical Christian clubs founded in 1996 
 Generation Joshua – Conservative Christian political group founded in 2003

Jewish
BBYO || Religious pluralism || Zionism
NFTY: The Reform Jewish Youth Movement || Reform Judaism || Reform Zionism || Union for Reform Judaism
NCSY || Orthodox Judaism || || Orthodox Union
United Synagogue Youth || Conservative Judaism || Zionism || United Synagogue of Conservative Judaism
Young Judaea || Religious pluralism || Zionism

Other
 4-H
 AFS Intercultural Programs - international youth exchange program, founded in 1915
 Boy Spies of America - existed during World War I to seek out spies
 Boys & Girls Clubs of America
 Campus Kitchen - founded in 2001, works to have extra food from campus kitchens donated to people in need
 Children's Express - existed 1975–2001, news agency run by children ages 8 to 18
 Civil Air Patrol
 The Choice Program
 Federation of Galaxy Explorers - founded in 2002
 The First Tee - a golfing associated program founded in 1997
 Freedom's Answer - founded in 2002(?), supports voter registration and turnout 
 Future Business Leaders of America - a high school club founded in 1940 to build future business leaders.  
 Girls For A Change - girls implementing social change projects, founded in 2002
 Girls, Inc. - roots back to 1865 but has been national since 1945
 Ignition - student to student high school mentoring program
 Junior Birdmen - existed during the 1930s for boys interested in model airplanes
 Junior G-Men - existed during the late 1930s and early 1940s for boys 
 Junior State of America - a high school club founded in 1934 to develop political leadership skills; claims about 10,000 members
 Key Club International - a high school club founded in 1925 to building community service skills, sponsored by Kiwanis International
 Link Crew - student to student mentoring program
 Mexican American Youth Organization - civil rights organization founded in 1967
 Moriya - learning program for young Jewish girls
 National FFA Organization - at one time Future Farmers of America, but name changed in 1988; founded in 1928; membership of 610,245 in 2014
 National High School Rodeo Association - incorporated in 1961 but roots back to 1947
 National Junior Horticultural Association - founded in 1934
 National Postsecondary Agricultural Student Organization - founded in 1980
 National Student Association  - an association of university student governments founded in 1947 and merged with the National Student Lobby in 1978 to form the United Statues Student Association
 National Student Federation of America - an association of university student governments that existed from 1925 until the Second World War; succeeded by the National Student Association 
 National Junior Firefighter Program
 National Youth Administration - a New Deal agency dealing with youth aged 16–25 from 1935 until 1943
 New Farmers of America - African-American version of Future Farmers of America; founded in 1935; merged with Future Farmers of America in 1965
 OneMillionOfUs - youth civic education & impact organization, founded in March 2019.
 Rainbow Girls - young girl service organization sponsored by Freemasons
 Running Start: Bringing Young Women to Politics
 SUSTA The Federation of Ukrainian Student Organizations of America - founded in 1953
 Safe Schools/Healthy Students
 Sons of the American Legion - organization of male descendants of U.S. war veterans (from World War I to the present day) founded in 1932
 Southern Negro Youth Congress - existed from 1937 until 1949
 Students Today Leaders Forever - founded in 2003
 Taiwanese American Foundation
 Teens in Prevention
 United States Naval Sea Cadet Corps
 United States Student Association - association of university student governments founded in 1978 with the merger of the National Student Association and the National Student Lobby
 United States Youth Council - existed from 1945 until 1986
 United States Youth Government - youth advocacy group with members elected by the public in a structure based on the Constitution of the United States
 Urban debate league
 White Stag Leadership Development Program
 YMCA Youth and Government
 Young Judaea - Zionist youth organization
 Youth Activism Project - founded in 1992

Age groups

Other groups' external links
 Keepers of the Faith is an independent, decentralized purchasable Christian Scout-like program that originated in the United States with separate programs for boys (Contenders for the Faith), and girls (formerly Keepers at Home), though they can be coordinated, and there can be overlap in the skills learned and activities.
 Young Vikings Club is a Norse heathen Scout-like organization for youth from 6–18 years old.
 Moriya is a learning program for Jewish young girls.
 The United States Youth Government is a youth advocacy organization representing U.S. citizens and residents aged 0–29, with a structure based on the Constitution of the United States. Its members, who must be younger than 29, are elected by the public aged 0–29 to represent individual U.S. states and territories in the organization's legislature, the Youth Assembly. The public also elects a Youth President and Vice-President, who lead the organization and appoint Justices to the Supreme Youth Court.

References

 

 

 

 
Non-aligned Scouting organizations
Scouting in the United States